The 1995 Miami Hurricanes baseball team represented the University of Miami in the 1995 NCAA Division I baseball season. The Hurricanes played their home games at Mark Light Field. The team was coached by Jim Morris in his second season at Miami.

The Hurricanes reached the College World Series, where they finished tied for third after recording wins against Southern California and Florida State and a pair of semifinal losses to eventual runner-up Southern California.

Personnel

Roster

Coaches

Schedule and results

References

Miami Hurricanes baseball seasons
Miami Hurricanes
College World Series seasons
Miami
Miami Hurricanes baseball